The 1996 Tipperary Senior Hurling Championship was the 106th staging of the Tipperary Senior Hurling Championship since its establishment by the Tipperary County Board in 1887. The championship began on 21 September 1996 and ended 27 October 1996.

Nenagh Éire Óg were the defending champions, however, they failed to qualify after being defeated by Lorrha-Dorrha in the first round of the North Championship.

On 27 October 1996, Boherlahan-Dualla won the championship after a 1-16 to 2-12 defeat of Toomevara in the final at Semple Stadium. It was their 11th championship title overall and their first title since 1941. It remains their last championship triumph.

Qualification

Results

Quarter-finals

Semi-finals

Final

Championship statistics

Top scorers

Top scorers overall

Top scorers in a single game

Miscellaneous
 Boherlahan-Dualla win the title for the first time since 1941.
 Toomevara lose a final for the first time since 1961.

References

External links
 The County Senior Hurling Championship 1996

Tipperary
Tipperary Senior Hurling Championship